Terence Smith (born September 23, 1991) is a Canadian soccer player who plays as a defender for Michigan Stars FC in the National Independent Soccer Association.

Early life
He was born in Windsor, Ontario and grew up in Brampton. He attended St. John Bosco Elementary school where he played basketball, soccer, and track and field. He attended St. Marguerite d'Youville Catholic Secondary School, where he played football, basketball and soccer. He attended George Brown College in Toronto, for one year earning a diploma in general arts and sciences. He earned a soccer scholarship and went on to earn a Bachelor of Arts degree from Northeastern State University in Oklahoma.

Career

College and amateur
Smith played four years of college soccer at Northeastern State University in between 2011 and 2014. During Smith's well decorated career at NSU he was a; 3 x All MIAA, 3 x All Region and 2 x All Daktronic player. From 2012 to 2014 Smith led NSU to its lowest goals against total for 3 straight season's, every year breaking a school record which still stands today. Smith also helped lead NSU to its first MIAA Regular Season Championship and the schools first and only MIAA Conference Tournament Title.

Before and during college, Smith also played for USL Premier Development League side Toronto Lynx between 2010 and 2014. Smith signed for National Premier Soccer League side Tulsa Athletic in 2016 which he was voted into the National Premier Soccer League Supporters’ XI which is an all-league team voted on by the NPSL's fans and supporters.

Professional
On January 19, 2018, Smith signed with the United Soccer League club Tulsa Roughnecks. He made his professional debut on October 10, 2018, starting in a 1–0 loss to Saint Louis FC.

In 2020, Smith was signed by Michigan Stars FC ahead of their first professional season in the National Independent Soccer Association.

International career 
Smith earned his first call up for Barbados national football team for their 2019–20 CONCACAF Nations League qualifying round game on November 18 (2018) vs U.S. Virgin Islands Soccer Federation which they won 3–0. He was then called up a year later for the concacaf nations league qualifiers in October 2019, the team won 1–0 in Barbados.

Acting and Modelling Career 
As a preteen, Terence was represented by Minor Details Model and Talent. His print modelling  work includes Sears back to school flyer, and a Nelson Educational text book. In addition, he earned acting roles, including that of a student in an AIDs awareness short film which was shown at the XVI International AIDS Conference, 2006 held in Toronto, and a zombie in a 2008 YTV Halloween Promo.

As a teenager and currently he is represented by Applause Bickerton Model and Talent Agency. He has done various print and acting work.  During 2019 he appeared in media ads for Backwoods Cigars, TD Music, and Humira. His acting roles include playing a cameraman in the Paranormal Witness series, 2012 episode, The Tenants   and a backup dancer in the 2016, Michael Buble music video, Nobody but Me.

References

External links
 
 

1991 births
Living people
Canadian soccer players
Canadian expatriate soccer players
Northeastern State RiverHawks athletes
Toronto Lynx players
FC Tulsa players
Association football defenders
Canadian expatriate sportspeople in the United States
Expatriate soccer players in the United States
Soccer people from Ontario
Sportspeople from Windsor, Ontario
Barbados international footballers
International Soccer League players
Tulsa Athletic players
Barbadian footballers
USL Championship players
Black Canadian soccer players